Capital punishment is a legal penalty in Israel. Capital punishment has only been imposed twice in the history of the state and is only to be handed out for treason, genocide, crimes against humanity, and crimes against the Jewish people during wartime. Israel is one of seven countries that has abolished capital punishment for "ordinary crimes only."

Israel inherited the Mandatory Palestine code of law, which included capital punishment for several crimes, but in 1954, Israel abolished the penalty for murder. The last execution was carried out in 1962, when Holocaust architect Adolf Eichmann was hanged for genocide and crimes against humanity. The last death sentence in Israel was handed down in 1988, when John Demjanjuk was sentenced to death for war crimes and crimes against humanity; his sentence (and conviction) was subsequently overturned in 1993 following an appeal to the Israeli Supreme Court. No death sentences have been sought by Israeli prosecutors since the 1990s.

History 
Israel's rare use of the death penalty may in part be due to Jewish religious law. Biblical law explicitly mandates the death penalty for 36 offenses, from murder and adultery to idolatry and desecration of the Sabbath. However, in ancient Israel, the death penalty was rarely carried out. Jewish scholars since the beginning of the common era have developed such restrictive rules to prevent execution of the innocent that the death penalty has become de facto abolished. Moses Maimonides argued that executing a defendant on anything less than absolute certainty would lead to a slippery slope of decreasing burdens of proof, until we would be convicting merely "according to the judge's caprice". His concern was maintaining popular respect for law, and he saw errors of commission as much more threatening than errors of omission. Conservative Jewish religious leaders and scholars believe that the death penalty should remain unused, even in extreme cases such as political assassination.

When the modern state of Israel was established in 1948, it inherited the British Mandate's legal code, with a few adjustments, and thus capital punishment remained on the books. During the 1948 Arab–Israeli War, the first execution took place after Meir Tobianski, an Israeli army officer, was falsely accused of espionage, subjected to a drumhead court martial and found guilty. He was executed by firing squad, but later posthumously exonerated.

In December 1948, it was decided that in the event of further death sentences, all executions would be stayed until the government determined the fate of the death penalty. The first death sentences imposed by an Israeli civil court, against two Arabs who had been found guilty of murder, were confirmed by an appeals court in November 1949, but the sentences were commuted to life imprisonment by President Chaim Weizmann, due to his opposition to the death penalty. The Israeli cabinet first considered abolishing the death penalty in July 1949.

In 1950, seven convicted murderers were on death row in Israel. In 1951 the Israeli cabinet again proposed that the death penalty be abolished. The 1950 Nazis and Nazi Collaborators (Punishment) Law prescribes a mandatory death sentence for the most serious crimes in the law, which was first imposed in 1952 imposed on Yechezkel Ingster, who was convicted of crimes against humanity for torturing and beating other Jews as a kapo. The court also recommended that the death sentence be commuted; he had lost a leg and suffered from a heart ailment. Ingster served time in jail and was later pardoned but died shortly after he was released. In 1953, another death sentence for murder was imposed. It was not carried out, and the convicted murderer received a presidential pardon six years later.

In 1954 the Knesset voted to abolish the death penalty for the crime of murder. The death penalty was retained for war crimes, crimes against humanity, crimes against the Jewish people, treason and certain crimes under military law during wartime.

In 1962 the second execution—and the only civil execution—in Israel took place when Adolf Eichmann was hanged after being convicted in 1961 of participation in Nazi war crimes relating to the Holocaust.

Throughout the following decades, death sentences were occasionally handed down to those convicted of terrorist offenses, but these sentences were always commuted. In 1988 John Demjanjuk, a guard in a Nazi death camp during the war, was convicted of war crimes and sentenced to death after being identified as the guard nicknamed "Ivan the Terrible" by inmates for his brutality, but his identification, conviction and sentence were later overturned on appeal. In the mid-1990s the practice of seeking the death penalty for those facing terrorism charges ceased.

In the aftermath of the Itamar attack in 2011, the issue of the death penalty briefly came up again. Israeli military prosecutors were expected to seek the death penalty for the perpetrators, but in the end did not. Even so, the judges seriously considered imposing the death penalty when determining the sentence of one of the perpetrators, but decided not to, as the prosecution had not requested it.

In the March 2015 election, the Yisrael Beiteinu party ran on a platform that included death sentences for terrorists; in July of the same year a bill was proposed, and sponsored by one of the party's members, to allow a majority of presiding judges to sentence a terrorist to death. By a vote of 94–6 the bill was rejected in its first reading.

Calls for imposition of the death penalty
Israeli politicians have sometimes called for the imposition of the death penalty on specific criminals. In 2010 Member of the Knesset Ayoub Kara called for the imposition of the death penalty on the perpetrator of the Tapuah Junction stabbing (2010).  In 2017 political figures including Prime Minister Benjamin Netanyahu called for the penalty to be imposed on the perpetrator of the 2017 Halamish stabbing attack. Representatives in the government plan to introduce to the Knesset a bill which would allow the death penalty for terrorism. In January 2018, a bill making it easier for military courts to hand down death sentences was approved by the Knesset in a preliminary vote of 52-49. Prime Minister Netanyahu voted in favor, but later said the bill required "deeper discussion" among the ministers before being voted on again. Netanyahu stated that he would be supporting a bill that would make the death penalty a common punishment. If the proposed bill becomes law, it would allow the IDF military court martial in the West Bank (including East Jerusalem) to sentence those convicted of terrorism charges to the death penalty, only with the approval of the majority of a panel of judges.

Avigdor Lieberman and his Yisrael Beiteinu party are strongly supportive of the death penalty for terrorists.

In March 2023, a bill for the death penalty against terrorism offences was passed in the Knesset in a preliminary vote by 55-9. The bill was supported and pushed by Itamar Ben-Gvir and Jewish Power party.

Public opinion
A 2017 poll found that close to 70% of Israelis would support giving death penalty after a trial to Palestinians who murdered Israeli citizens.

Executed people

See also 
 Capital and corporal punishment in Judaism
 Human rights in Israel
 Israeli targeted killings
 List of capital crimes in the Torah
 Religion and capital punishment

References

External links 
 JewishEncyclopedia.com - CAPITAL PUNISHMENT
 Religious Action Center - Death Penalty

Israel
Penal system in Israel
Judaism and capital punishment
Death in Israel
1954 disestablishments in Israel
Human rights abuses in Israel